This is a list of number-one hits by Australian artists in the United States from the Billboard Hot 100. Weeks followed by an asterisk (*) indicates that the song is still charting and subject to change.

See also
List of Billboard Hot 100 number-ones by British artists
List of Billboard Hot 100 number-ones by Canadian artists
List of Billboard Hot 100 number-ones by European artists

Notes

 Olivia Newton-John was born in the United Kingdom and moved to Australia at the age of five. This made her a British-born Australian.
 The Bee Gees were born on the Isle of Man, a Crown dependency that is not part of the United Kingdom, and moved to the UK in their early childhood. In 1958, when oldest brother Barry was 12 and twins Robin and Maurice were 9, they moved to Australia and resided there for about ten years before moving back to the UK. This makes the Bee Gees Australian, English and Manx.
 Andy Gibb was the younger brother of the Bee Gees. He was born in the UK, but was only 6 months old when his family emigrated to Australia. He spent most of his childhood in Australia before moving to the US to launch his international recording career.
 Graham Russell of Air Supply was born in Britain but is now an Australian citizen, while Russell Hitchcock is Australian.
 Gotye was born in Belgium but moved to Australia at the age of two and was raised there.
 Iggy Azalea was born in Australia before moving to the United States at the age of 16.

References 

Australian artists
Billboard Hot 100 number-ones